The Copenhagen Denmark Temple is the 118th operating temple of the Church of Jesus Christ of Latter-day Saints (LDS Church). The Copenhagen Denmark Temple is one of the few temples that have been converted from existing buildings.

History
The building of the temple in Denmark was announced on March 17, 1999. On April 24, 1999 the site for the temple in Frederiksberg was dedicated and a groundbreaking ceremony held, with Spencer J. Condie presiding. About 700 church members from the area attended the ceremony.

As the church had done with the Vernal Utah Temple, the Copenhagen Denmark Temple is a renovation of an existing building, the Priorvej Chapel. This chapel was built by LDS members in 1931 and was dedicated by John A. Widtsoe, a member of the Quorum of the Twelve Apostles. It was built in the Neo-classical style with columns in the front. Most of the renovation of the building was done on the inside. The church wanted to keep the outside looking as it did originally.

The Copenhagen Denmark Temple has had a long and full history. The day the chapel was dedicated, June 14, was the eighty-first anniversary of the day that the first Mormon missionaries arrived in Denmark. During World War II the chapel was used as a bomb shelter, but the building managed to survive the war with little damage. After World War II the chapel was remodeled to hold more classrooms for the growing membership. As of May 2015, Denmark has a church membership of approximately 4,400.

From April 29 through May 15, 2004 an open house was held to let people see the inside of the temple. More than 25,000 people toured the temple during that time. The dedication of the temple was held on Sunday May 23, 2004. More than 4,000 members attended the four dedicatory services held throughout the day. LDS Church president Gordon B. Hinckley gave the dedicatory prayer.
 

In 2020, the Copenhagen Denmark Temple was closed in response to the coronavirus pandemic.

See also

 Comparison of temples of The Church of Jesus Christ of Latter-day Saints
 List of temples of The Church of Jesus Christ of Latter-day Saints
 List of temples of The Church of Jesus Christ of Latter-day Saints by geographic region
 Temple architecture (Latter-day Saints)

References

External links
 
Copenhagen Denmark Temple Official site
Copenhagen Denmark Temple at ChurchofJesusChristTemples.org

21st-century Latter Day Saint temples
Religious buildings and structures in Copenhagen
Religious buildings and structures completed in 2004
Temples (LDS Church) in Europe
The Church of Jesus Christ of Latter-day Saints in Denmark
2004 establishments in Denmark